Farmington Senior High School is a public comprehensive high school in Farmington, Missouri that is part of the Farmington School District.

As of 2019-2020 the student body is 93% white, 3% African-American, 2% Hispanic and 1% Asian.

Alumni
Kyle Richardson: National Football League player

Faculty
Barney Pelty, baseball coach; Major League Baseball pitcher.

Publications 
The school has two publications, an online newspaper called Knight Life and a yearbook called Knights in Review.

References

Public high schools in Missouri
Schools in St. Francois County, Missouri